Iván Diego Santillán Atoche (born 6 May 1990) is a Peruvian footballer who plays as a left back for Club Universitario de Deportes in the Peruvian Primera División.

Club career
Iván Santillán began his senior career with Coronel Bolognesi in 2009. He made his Torneo Descentralizado league debut in round 2 at home against Alianza Lima. Manager Roberto Mosquera put him in late the match for Javier Chumpitaz, but in the end his side lost 1–2. In his fourth match he made his first league start, playing the entire match in the 1–4 defeat to CD Universidad San Martin. He finished his debut season in the top-flight with nine league appearances.

Then in January 2012 Santillán joined newly promoted side Real Garcilaso.

After much controversy, Santillán was sold to Tiburones Rojos de Veracruz in January 2019. On 2020, Santillán went back to Perú to play in Universitario de Deportes.

References

External links

1990 births
Living people
Peruvian footballers
Peruvian expatriate footballers
Coronel Bolognesi footballers
Real Garcilaso footballers
C.D. Veracruz footballers
Club Universitario de Deportes footballers
Peruvian Primera División players
Peruvian Segunda División players
Liga MX players
Association football fullbacks
Peruvian expatriate sportspeople in Mexico
Expatriate footballers in Mexico